The LM358 is a low-power dual operational amplifier integrated circuit, originally introduced by National Semiconductor.

It supports an operating voltage of +3 to +32 volts (single power supply) or  ±1.5 to ±16 volts (dual power supplies).

Input voltage can range from −0.3 to +32 volts with single power supply. Small negative input voltages below ground are acceptable because the bipolar junction transistors at the input stage are configured such that their base-emitter junction voltage provides just enough voltage differential between the collector and base for the transistors to function.

References

Further reading
The LM358 is now an industry-standard part manufactured by multiple companies, all of which publish datasheets:
 Diodes Incorporated: datasheet, webpage
 Fairchild Semiconductor: datasheet, webpage
 ON Semiconductor: datasheet, webpage
 ST Microelectronics: datasheet, webpage
 Texas Instruments: datasheet, webpage
 National Semiconductor: datasheet, supporting materials for MIT course 6.115.

Linear integrated circuits